Surnadal is a municipality in Møre og Romsdal county, Norway. It is part of the Nordmøre region. The administrative centre is the village of Skei. Other villages in Surnadal include Glærem, Mo, Stangvik, Surnadalsøra, Sylte, Todalsøra, and Åsskard.

A mild climate and rich soil make Surnadal well suited for agriculture. The local economy is based on agriculture, forestry, and industrial production, in addition to services.

The  municipality is the 68th largest by area out of the 356 municipalities in Norway. Surnadal is the 163rd most populous municipality in Norway with a population of 5,849.

General information
The parish of Surnadal was established as a municipality on 1 January 1838 (see formannskapsdistrikt law). In 1858, the eastern district (population: 2,684) was separated from Surnadal to form the new Rindal Municipality. This left Surnadal with 3,105 residents. On 1 January 1877, part of Stangvik Municipality (population: 50) was transferred to Surnadal. In 1879, part of Surnadal (population: 83) was transferred to the neighboring Stangvik Municipality. On 1 January 1886, the Møklegjerdet farm (population: 29), just west of the village of Glærem, was transferred from Stangvik to Surnadal. On 1 January 1897, the Sjøflot farm (population: 27) was also transferred from Stangvik to Surnadal. During the 1960s, there were many municipal mergers across Norway due to the work of the Schei Committee. On 1 January 1965, all of Åsskard Municipality (population: 1,014) and most of Stangvik Municipality (population: 1,386) were merged with Surnadal Municipality (population: 3,534) to create a new, larger municipality of Surnadal with a total population of 5,934.

Name
The Old Norse form of the name was Súrnardalr. The first element is the genitive case of the river name Surna and the last element is dalr which means "valley" or "dale". The meaning of the river name is unknown. Before 1918, the name was written Surendalen.

Coat of arms
The coat of arms was granted in 1989. It shows two silver or white wavy lines on a green background. The wavy lines represent the many rivers in the municipality, the most notable one being the Surna.

Churches
The Church of Norway has five parishes within the municipality of Surnadal. It is part of the Indre Nordmøre prosti (deanery) in the Diocese of Møre.

Geography

The municipality is made up by the main valley, Surnadalen through which the river Surna runs. There are also many smaller side valleys including Stor-Bæverdalen, Settemsdalen, Øvstbødalen, Todalen, and Vinddøldalen. The municipality is bordered by the Trollheimen mountain range and Sunndal Municipality to the south, the neighboring Rindal Municipality to the east, Halsa Municipality to the north, and several fjords to the west: Trongfjorden, Stangvikfjorden, and Todalsfjorden. There are three main fjords that cut into the municipality: Åsskardfjorden, Hamnesfjorden, and Surnadalsfjorden.

The landscape is a combination of forests, fjords, and mountains. Other mountains include Vassnebba, Indre Sula and Ytre Sula, Neådalssnota, and Trollhetta. The river Surna runs through the valley from the east to the west, and forms a large delta where it enters the fjord near Surnadalsøra and Skei. This river is rich in salmon, which attract tourists from the rest of the country and abroad. The lakes Foldsjøen and Gråsjøen lie along the border with the municipality of Rindal in the east. The Grønkjølen Nature Reserve lies in the extreme northeast of the municipality.

Climate
Surnadal is situated at the head of a long fjord some distance from the coast and has an oceanic climate or humid continental climate, depending on winter threshold used gives oceanic,  gives humid continental). The wettest season is August–December, while Feb - May is the driest. The record high  recorded 27 July 2018. The warmest night was 29 July 2018 with low . Winter temperatures can get below , although that is rare.

Government
All municipalities in Norway, including Surnadal, are responsible for primary education (through 10th grade), outpatient health services, senior citizen services, unemployment and other social services, zoning, economic development, and municipal roads. The municipality is governed by a municipal council of elected representatives, which in turn elect a mayor.  The municipality falls under the Møre og Romsdal District Court and the Frostating Court of Appeal.

Municipal council
The municipal council of Surnadal is made up of 27 representatives that are elected to four year terms. The party breakdown of the council is as follows:

Mayor
The mayors of Surnadal (incomplete list):
2019–present: Margrethe Svinvik (Sp)
2014-2019: Lilly Gunn Nyheim (Ap)
2007-2014: Mons Otnes (Ap)
1997-2007: Bergsvein Brøske (Sp)
1995-1996: Asbjørn Ørsal (Ap)
1992-1995: Ola O. Fiske (Sp)
1987-1991: Helge Vold (Ap)
1984-1986: Helge Røv (Ap)
1976-1983: Nils Magnar Torvik (Sp)

Transportation
Transportation services include ferries to the southwest and the northwest, which lead to the coastal areas of Møre og Romsdal, and a highway to the city of Trondheim to the east.

Notable residents

 Ole Andreas Lindeman (1769–1857) a musician, organist, composer and music educator
 Hans Hyldbakk (1898–2001) a Norwegian folklore poet 
 Anders Sæterøy (1901–1991) a politician and Mayor of Surnadal three times after WWII
 Kaare Espolin Johnson (1907–1994) a Norwegian artist and illustrator
 Helge Seip  (1919–2004) politician, leader of the Liberal party
 Alf Ramsøy (1925–2014) a long-distance runner, cross-country skier, actor and farmer
 Sverre Årnes (born 1949) a writer serial novels, short stories and articles
 Henning Sommerro (born 1952) a Norwegian musician, composer and academic
 Lars Steinar Ansnes (born 1956) a Norwegian editor
 Euronymous (1968–1993) real name Øystein Aarseth, early Norwegian black metal scene
 Rune Gjeldnes (born 1971) a Norwegian adventurer and explorer
 Ivar Loe Bjørnstad (born 1981) a Norwegian jazz and rock musician

Gallery

References

External links

Municipal fact sheet from Statistics Norway 

 
Nordmøre
Municipalities of Møre og Romsdal
1838 establishments in Norway